Live from Austin, TX is Eric Johnson's first live album, released in November 2005. The album showcases Johnson's seminal 1988 performance at Austin City Limits. The performance included a number of songs from Ah Via Musicom before its release in 1990, the album that a few years later would launch Johnson to fame as well as a pair of Jimi Hendrix covers.

Track listing
All songs written by Eric Johnson, except where noted.
 "Righteous" – 3:28
 "Love or Confusion" (Jimi Hendrix) – 3:05
 "Steve's Boogie" – 1:55
 "Trail of Tears" (Johnson, Stephen Barber, Carla Olsen) – 9:21
 "Western Flyer" (Johnson, Roscoe Beck, Tommy Taylor) – 3:43
 "East Wes" – 4:06
 "C.W." (Kyle Brock) – 0:55
 "Camel's Night Out" (Kyle Brock, Mark Younger-Smith) – 4:16
 "Emerald Eyes" (Johnson, Jay Aaron) – 4:17
 "Cliffs of Dover" – 6:13
 "Desert Rose" (Johnson, Vince Mariani) – 4:57
 "Zap" – 5:38
 "Are You Experienced?" (Jimi Hendrix)

Personnel
 Eric Johnson - vocals, lead guitar
 Kyle Brock - bass guitar
 Tommy Taylor - drums

References

Eric Johnson albums
2005 live albums
New West Records live albums
Austin City Limits